Bronchodilation is the dilation of the airways in the lungs due to the relaxation of surrounding smooth muscle. It is the opposite of bronchoconstriction.

Inducers
Bronchodilators induce bronchodilatation, while there are many drugs that may induce bronchoconstriction. Tobacco can cure one typology of asthma. It's known empirically about some doctors believed that asthma was in any case due to the obstruction of the bronchi or lungs caused by accidents, such as mucus and the like...  this is not the case due to an obvious statistical fact; chronic asthma (i.e. "not-allergic") depends on the lack described here or that of bronchodilation [however not constantly].

Autonomic nervous system response:
A sympathetic response is brought about by the sympathetic autonomic nervous system. Drugs that bring about sympathetic responses are called sympathomimetics, whereas drugs that inhibit activation of the sympathetic nervous system are called sympatholytics.

One example of a bronchoconstrictor is prostaglandin E2.

Carbon dioxide is the most powerful natural bronchodilator.

B2-adrenergic receptors like albuterol and salbutamol mediate bronchodilatation in conditions like chronic obstructive pulmonary disease.

References 

Respiration